The 2014–15 Mississippi State Lady Bulldogs basketball team will represent Mississippi State University during the 2014–15 NCAA Division I women's basketball season college basketball season. The Lady Bulldogs were led by third year head coach Vic Schaefer. They play their home games at Humphrey Coliseum and were members of the Southeastern Conference. They finished the season 27–7, 11–5 in SEC play to finish in third place. They lost in the quarterfinals of the SEC women's tournament to Kentucky. They received at-large bid to the NCAA women's tournament where they defeated Tulane in the first round before losing to Duke in the second round.

Roster

Schedule

|-
!colspan=9 style="background:#660000; color:#FFFFFF;"| Exhibition

|-
!colspan=9 style="background:#660000; color:#FFFFFF;"| Non-conference regular season

|-
!colspan=9 style="background:#660000; color:#FFFFFF;"| SEC regular season

|-
!colspan=9 style="background:#660000; color:#FFFFFF;"| 2015 SEC Tournament

|-
!colspan=9 style="background:#660000; color:#FFFFFF;"| NCAA Women's Tournament

Source:

Rankings

See also
2014–15 Mississippi State Bulldogs basketball team

References

Mississippi State Bulldogs women's basketball seasons
Mississippi State
Mississippi
2015 in sports in Mississippi
2014 in sports in Mississippi